Getting Acquainted, subsequently retitled A Fair Exchange, is a 1914 American comedy silent film written and directed by Charles Chaplin, starring Chaplin and Mabel Normand, and produced by Mack Sennett for Keystone Studios .

Plot
In one of Chaplin's "park comedies" for Keystone Studios, Charlie and his domineering wife, Mrs. Sniffles, are walking in the greensward. When Mrs. Sniffles falls asleep on a park bench, Charlie takes the opportunity to walk away from her. He encounters pretty Mabel. At the moment, Mabel's husband, Ambrose, is occupied trying to help a stranger start his car. Charlie attempts to woo Mabel but is quickly rebuffed and a park policeman comes to her aid. Meanwhile, Ambrose encounters Charlie's wife and is attracted to her. He too is rebuffed. Ambrose and Charlie both run afoul of a pretty blonde woman and her fez-wearing escort. A park policeman pursues both Charlie and Ambrose for their unwanted attentions directed at strange women.Charlie is eventually caught by the policeman who brings him back to Mrs. Sniffles. She saves him from arrest but roughly begins to escort him home.

Released on December 5, 1914, Getting Acquainted was the next-to-last movie that Chaplin made for Keystone Studios. It marked the final time he appeared in the same film as Mabel Normand.

Reviews
A reviewer from Motion Picture World wrote, "Mabel Normand, Charles Chaplin and the others are undeniably comical in this lively farce."

A reviewer from The Cinema declared, "Yet another fine Charles Chaplin number including the celebrated Mabel Normand."

Cast
 Charles Chaplin - Mr. Sniffles
 Mabel Normand - Ambrose's wife
 Phyllis Allen - Mrs. Sniffles
 Mack Swain - Ambrose
 Harry McCoy - Flirt in park
 Edgar Kennedy - Policeman
 Cecile Arnold - Mary

See also
 List of American films of 1914

External links

1914 films
1914 comedy films
American silent short films
Short films directed by Charlie Chaplin
American black-and-white films
Keystone Studios films
Films produced by Mack Sennett
1914 short films
Silent American comedy films
Articles containing video clips
American comedy short films
1910s American films